The 2018 NCAA Division I Men's Lacrosse Championship weekend was the 48th annual single-elimination tournament to determine the national championship for National Collegiate Athletic Association (NCAA) Division I men's college lacrosse.

Seventeen teams competed in the tournament, based upon their performance during the regular season. For nine teams, entry into the tournament was by means of a conference tournament automatic qualifier and/or play in, while for eight teams at-large selection was determined by the NCAA selection committee.

Yale controlled the tournament finals from start to finish, though Duke kept the game suspenseful to the end. This was Yale’s first NCAA lacrosse title and second title overall. Yale's Ben Reeves tied Eamon McEneaney’s 1977 record for most points in an NCAA tournament with 25 points. McEneaney set the record in three tournament games. This was the sixth national championship game for Duke since 2005.

Teams

Bracket

Media coverage

Radio
Westwood One provided nationwide radio coverage of the semifinals and championship. It was once again streamed online at westwoodsports.com, through TuneIn, and on SiriusXM. Dave Ryan, Mark Dixon and Jason Horowitz provided the call for Westwood One.

Television
Every game of the 2018 Men's Lacrosse Championship was broadcast on the ESPN Networks (ESPN3- Opening Round,  ESPNU- First Round and Quarterfinals,  ESPN2- Semifinals and National Championship).

Broadcast Assignments
Opening Round
Andy Helwig & Sean Sharman - Buffalo, NY
First Round
Jay Alter & Ryan Boyle- New Haven, CT
Booker Corrigan & Mark Dixon- College Park, MD
Mike Corey & Don Zimmerman- Durham, NC
John Brickley & Matt Ward- South Bend, IN
Chris Cotter, Paul Carcaterra, & Ric Beardsley (Syracuse only)- Albany and Syracuse, NY
Anish Shroff & Quint Kessenich- Baltimore, MD
Quarterfinals, Semifinals, & National Championship
Anish Shroff, Quint Kessenich, & Paul Carcaterra

References

NCAA Division I Men's Lacrosse Championship
NCAA Division I Men's Lacrosse Championship
 
NCAA Division I Men's Lacrosse Championship
NCAA Division I Men's Lacrosse Championship
Lacrosse in Massachusetts
Sports competitions in Foxborough, Massachusetts